Rhodoplanes  is a phototrophic genus of bacteria.
Rhodoplanes produces hopanoids like diplopterol, tetrahymanol, 2-methyldiplopterol, 2-methyltetrahymanol, bacteriohopanetetrol, bacteriohopaneaminotriol and carotenoids like spirilloxanthin, rhodopin, anhydrorhodovibrin, 1,1′-dihydroxylycopene and 3,4,3′,4′-tetrahydrospirilloxanthin

References

Further reading 
 
 
 
 

 

Nitrobacteraceae
Bacteria genera